The 1999 Preakness Stakes was the 124th running of the Preakness Stakes thoroughbred horse race. The race took place on May 15, 1999, and was televised in the United States on the ABC television network. Charismatic, who was jockeyed by Chris Antley, won the race by one and one half lengths over runner-up Menifee.  Approximate post time was 5:28 p.m. Eastern Time. The race was run over a fast track in a final time of 1:55.32.  The Maryland Jockey Club reported total attendance of 116,526, this is recorded as second highest on the list of American thoroughbred racing top attended events for North America in 1999.

Payout 

The 126th Preakness Stakes Payout Schedule

 $2 Exacta: (6–5) paid $47.60
 $2 Trifecta: (6–5–4) paid $2,049.80
 $1 Superfecta: (6–5–4–11) paid $18,887.60

The full chart 

 Winning Breeder: William Stamps Farish III &  Parrish Hill Farm;  (KY)  
 Final Time: 1:55.32
 Track Condition: Fast
 Total Attendance: 116,526

See also 

 1999 Kentucky Derby
 1999 Belmont Stakes

References

External links 

 

1999
1999 in horse racing
1999 in American sports
1999 in sports in Maryland
May 1999 sports events in the United States
Horse races in Maryland